Tiny Toon Adventures: Wacky Sports Challenge (released as Tiny Toon Adventures: Wild & Wacky Sports in Europe and Tiny Toon Adventures: Dotabata Daiundoukai in Japan), released in 1994 for the Super NES and developed and published by Konami, is a sports video game based on the cartoon television series Tiny Toon Adventures. It is one of the few SNES games to feature an SNES Multitap supporting up to four simultaneous players.

The player can choose to play as either Buster Bunny, Babs Bunny, Plucky Duck, or Dizzy Devil and participate in various Olympic-style events. There are four difficulty levels, each with about six to seven events each.  Events include bungee jumping, a chicken run, saucer throwing, and obstacle courses.

Game Boy version
Tiny Toon Adventures: Wacky Sports (Tiny Toon Adventures 3: Doki Doki Sports Festival in Japan) was released in 1994 on the Nintendo Game Boy and developed and published by Konami.

In Wacky Sports, the players choose to play as either Buster Bunny or Babs Bunny and participate in own choice of sports activities, including baseball, soccer, or tennis. As Buster, the users can also play carnival games set up by characters such as Shirley the Loon and Fifi La Fume. Carnival games include a watergun gallery and a beat-the-clock challenge featuring Elmyra Duff.

If the Konami Code is used at the title screen, a level select feature becomes available.

Reception 

Power Unlimited gave the Game Boy version a review score of 49% writing: "Dull and lame action in this apparently quickly put together game in which the humor of the Tiny Toons does not come into its own at all."

References

External links

1994 video games
Game Boy games
Konami games
Multiple-sport video games
Fantasy sports video games
Multiplayer and single-player video games
Super Nintendo Entertainment System games
Video games based on Tiny Toon Adventures
Video games featuring female protagonists
Video games developed in Japan